Yarloop  is a town in the South West of Western Australia along the South Western Highway, between Waroona and Harvey. On 7 January 2016 a bushfire destroyed most of the town.

History
The name Yarloop is said to have originated from the words "yard loop", the rail loop into the timber yard there. However, the name is more likely Aboriginal in origin (most likely from the local Bindjareb Noongar people).

In 1849, Joseph Logue arrived in the area and farmed at nearby Cookernup. He was followed by  Eastcott, who used to collect river red gum bark and pit-sawn timber for other settlers, and John Bancells in 1886.

In 1894, Charles and Edwin Millar moved into the district looking to put nearby stands of jarrah to usethey had exported jarrah blocks to London for use in street paving. However, not everyone working at the mill wanted to live in the facilities, so a company town on the eastern side of the railway and a public town on the western side developed. A siding on the Perth-Bunbury Railway came into being in 1896.

In 1901, they made Yarloop the centre of their operations, and the town became even more important when in 1905 they closed their Denmark mills on the south coast. At their peak, they employed over 500 people in the Yarloop area. By the 1930s, they boasted the largest private railway in the world with eight railway systems and 25 locomotives. The timber mill, originally known as the Waigerup mill, still operates and in 1984 the mill town was classified as a conservation area by the National Trust and is now protected by the Yarloop Conservation Plan (1998) administered by the Heritage Council.

The town was gazetted in 1962.

Modern era
Yarloop became home to citrus growers, dairy farmers, vegetable growers and commuters. Until the bushfire of 2016, the town centre included many restored timber buildings along with the historical steam workshops. The workshops had many operating steam engines along with displays of the equipment used to maintain 25 steam locos and the timber production of millers. There is a heritage trail around the old mill town and conservation area. Facilities included a primary school, local shop, bowling club, hotel, post office, community centre  and various types of accommodation.

A notable issue in the town was alleged emissions from the Alcoa alumina refinery at nearby Wagerup. For years, some residents have reported illnesses such as respiratory irritation, frequent blood noses, headaches, nausea and cancer, as reported in numerous media outlets, including the Four Corners program "Something in the Air", although no formal causal link has ever been established. These claims are also disputed by a large section of the local population. Alcoa subsequently obtained permission (September 2006) to double the size of the refinery to become the biggest such refinery in the world, although very strict conditions have been imposed on the expansion by the Health and Environment departments. A minority of the residents announced plans to fight the decision in the Supreme Court.

2016 bushfire

On 7 January 2016, 121 homes were destroyed by a massive bushfire.  Over a seven-minute period, the fire also burned the historic timber workshops, factories, an old church, the old hospital, shops, the hotel, fire station and a part of the school. Local politician Murray Cowper, observing soon afterwards that the town now looked "very surreal", said: "This could well be the end of the town." Those visiting the town after the fire described the level of destruction as "apocalyptic". However, Western Australia's Premier Colin Barnett said that the town would be rebuilt, and a majority of residents voted in favour of rebuilding. On 9 January the remains of two men were found in burnt-out houses.

Public access to Yarloop was restored on 11 August 2016, seven months after the fire, when roadblocks were removed.

Rebuilding
A new community centre was built, incorporating the facade of the original town hall, and opened in November 2019.

Transport

Yarloop is situated on the South Western Railway, and is a stopping place for the Australind passenger train from Perth to Bunbury.

References

External links
Map of Yarloop (Shire of Harvey)
Aerial footage of Yarloop on the morning of 8 January 2016
"Reframing Rural Fire Management": Report of the Special Inquiry Into the January 2016 Waroona Fire WA Governmenr-Waroona Fire Special Enquiry. 29 April 2016. Retrieved 11 August 2016–via www.documentcloud.org. 

Shire of Harvey
Timber towns in Western Australia
Bushfire affected towns in Western Australia